Punk Goes Pop Vol. 6 is a compilation album in the Punk Goes... series created by Fearless Records.

Track listing

 Set It Off's cover of "Problem" samples "No Scrubs" by TLC. This sample was removed in the 2015 re-release.
 Upon a Burning Body and Ice-T's cover of "Turn Down For What" is not included in the 2015 re-release.

2015 re-release

Sampler Track listing
Punk Goes Pop Vol. 6 also included a bonus sampler CD with every physical copy of the album when bought through Alternative Press. The sampler CD contains 13 previous released songs by bands from the Fearless Records label.

Chart performance

Year-end charts

References

Covers albums
Punk Goes series
2014 compilation albums